Gibeauxiella genitrix is a moth in the family Cosmopterigidae. It was described by Edward Meyrick in 1927. It is found in South Africa. It belongs to the Cosmopterigidae family under the sub family, Antequerinae.

References

Endemic moths of South Africa
Antequerinae
Moths described in 1927
Taxa named by Edward Meyrick